"Lovin' Up a Storm" is a song written by Allyson R. Khent and Luther Dixon and originally recorded by Jerry Lee Lewis, who released it as a single, with "Big Blon' Baby" on the other side, in 1959 on Sun Records.

The song has been covered by a number of artists.

Track listing

Charts

References 

1959 songs
1959 singles
Jerry Lee Lewis songs
Sun Records singles
Songs written by Luther Dixon